Resolution of the CPC Central Committee on the Major Achievements and Historical Experience of the Party over the Past Century, commonly known as the "third historical resolution", is a document adopted by the Central Committee of the Chinese Communist Party (CCP) on its Sixth Plenary Session held between 8–11 November 2021. This document was the third of its kind after "historical resolutions" adopted by Mao Zedong and Deng Xiaoping, with the document declaring that CCP general secretary Xi Jinping's leadership as being “the key to the great rejuvenation of the Chinese nation". In comparison with the other historical resolutions, Xi's one did not herald a major change in how the CCP evaluated its history.

See also 

 Ideology of the Chinese Communist Party

References 

2021 documents
Xi Jinping Thought